The DINFIA IA 46 Ranquel, IA 46 Super Ranquel, and IA 51 Tehuelche  were Argentine utility aircraft developed in the late 1950s.

Development and construction

The intention was to create a light aircraft suitable for aeroclub and agricultural use, and the resulting design was a conventional high-wing strut-braced monoplane with fixed tailwheel undercarriage. The aircraft were named for the Ranquel and Tehuelche peoples, different groups indigenous to Patagonia.

The state-owned Dinfia organisation commenced production of the Ranquel at Cordoba in 1958. Construction was of a fabric-covered tubular structure, although the Tehuelche featured metal-covered wings. Accommodation was provided for a single pilot and a passenger in tandem configuration. In all, some 132 aircraft were built, some of which served as glider tugs for the Fuerza Aerea Argentina.

Production ended in December 1968.

Operational history

Examples of the IA.46 have served aero clubs from 1958 to date, with several remaining in operation in the late 2000s.

Variants
IA 46 Ranquel
Initial production version with Lycoming O-320-A2B engine, one prototype and 115 production aircraft built.
IA 46 Super Ranquel
Version of IA 46 with Lycoming O-360-A1A engine, 16 built.
IA 51 Tehuelche
Version with metal-covered wings, larger flaps, and fuel capacity increased to 500 L (130 US gal). One built, first flown on 16 March 1963.

Operators

Argentine Air Force

Specifications (IA 46 Ranquel)

References
Notes

Bibliography

External links

1950s Argentine civil utility aircraft
1950s Argentine agricultural aircraft
FMA aircraft
High-wing aircraft
Single-engined tractor aircraft
Aircraft first flown in 1957